Vicki Susan O'Halloran  (born 20 June 1964) is an Australian businesswoman and community worker, who was CEO of Somerville Community Services in the Northern Territory from 1998 to 2017. On 31 October 2017, she was sworn in as the 22nd administrator of the Northern Territory, replacing John Hardy.

O'Halloran was born in Burnie, Tasmania, and educated at Smithton High School and Devonport Community College. She worked as an education officer and child care director for Circular Head Council, before moving to Darwin, Northern Territory in 1989 where she studied for a Bachelor of Children's Services at Charles Darwin University. In 1993, she joined Somerville Community Services, as deputy CEO and manager, and became CEO in 1998.

In 2014, O'Halloran was made a Member of the Order of Australia for significant service to people with a disability through roles with a range of organisations, and to the community. She was subsequently advanced to Officer of the Order of Australia in the 2019 Queen's Birthday Honours for distinguished service to the people of the Northern Territory, and to the disability sector through a range of executive roles. She was appointed Commander of the Royal Victorian Order (CVO) in the 2023 New Year Honours.

References

1964 births
Living people
Administrators of the Northern Territory
Australian chief executives
Officers of the Order of Australia
Australian Commanders of the Royal Victorian Order
Charles Darwin University alumni
People from Burnie, Tasmania